Fries with That? is a YTV produced sitcom. It first aired in April 2004.

This sitcom revolves around a group of high school students who work at a local fast-food restaurant named Bulky's in Montreal, Quebec, Canada.

The sitcom follows primarily five high school students and focuses on many themes such as love, responsibility, friendship, and honesty.

It was cancelled after completion of the second season due to declining ratings.

Principal characters 
Pattie, cashier. She enjoys playing sports, especially Canadian football and basketball. She uses her athleticism to compensate for her lack of intellect. For example, Pattie uses a unique studying technique, which involves shooting a piece of paper into a makeshift basket in order to learn specific historical events such as July 1, 1867 (Canadian Confederation). Although she is in touch with her masculine side, she is extremely romantic. Her taste for men can vary from an ostracized nerd to a handsome criminal, and she once had feelings for Alex. Her full name is Patricia Johnson.

Tess, cashier. Tess is the free spirit of the crew. Her French accent and last name indicate that she comes from a Francophone household. Her colleagues know her to be extremely creative and artistic. She tends to be rather eccentric, and she believes her aura/soul has a huge presence in her life and should be taken seriously, but is often ignored. She is obsessed with the paranormal and likes to use it as an explanation for everyday occurrences. She is often distracted at work by studying, art projects, deadlines, songs, extra projects, or boys. Her full name is Tess Laverière.

Robyn, cashier, griller, dishwasher. She is the most functional member of the group. She claims to hate men, but has a secret crush on Alex. She hints at the secret several times, but Alex could never figure it out. For example, when Alex and Pattie were mistakenly believed to be in a serious relationship, she indicated with two miniature figurines that they would not be married; she also moped and ate expired chocolate. Her full name is Robyn Cohen.

Alex, burger-flipper. Alex is the typical handsome egotistical teenager. Although he has a reputation of being rude, disgusting, and inconsiderate, he is a loyal friend. He is not very romantic and fails to recognize Robyn's attraction. He tends to be very physical in his relationships and cannot seem to keep his hands off girls that attract him. He also loves to provoke his extremely obsessive assistant manager, Ben Shaw, and they seem to be in a constant state of frustration with each other. His full name is Alexander Kurzi.

Ben is the highly obsessive and greedy assistant manager. He only wants one thing: more profits for Bulky's so that he can get some recognition and finally become the manager. He is sometimes aloof and unpleasant, but other times friendly and accepting. He is a perfectionist and tends to stress easily. Some crewmembers wish he would fall off a bridge, just so they could have a day off. He enjoys making up absurd but "official" sounding rules such as "no member of the crew at Bulky’s is allowed to date another crewmember at Bulky’s." Ben is also an excellent mathematician and greatly enjoys listing and calculating profits. His full name is Benjamin Shaw.

Meiyan, introduced in season two. She loves to annoy Ben, and tried to take his job when he faked his death.

Eddie is not part of the main crew, but rather an employee that transports the supplies from the warehouse to the restaurant. He is portrayed as a simpleton, but revealed he got 100% on all of his provincial exams without cheating. He often replies "? I'm super good at _" whenever anyone mentions something they have problems with, but usually, Eddie turns out to not be as good as he says he is. His full name is Eduardo Samisk.

The "head office guy" supervises the restaurant and is constantly bombarding Ben and the crew with threats in order to increase productivity. He tends to be serious, but can be lighthearted, such as when he pulled an April Fool's Day prank on the crew.

Origin of the series 

Fries with That? was inspired by the Quebec French language VRAK.TV sitcom Une grenade avec ça? ("A grenade With That?").

Episodes

Season 1

Season 2

Cast
 Jeanne Bowser as Pattie Johnson
 Giancarlo Caltabiano as Ben Shaw
 Morgan Kelly as Alex Kurzi
 Stefanie Buxton as Robyn Cohen
 Anne-Marie Baronas Tess Laverriere
 Li Li as Meiyan
 Kent McQuaid as Eddie
 Heidi Foss as the Principal
 Arthur Holden as Head Office Guy

External links

 

2004 Canadian television series debuts
2000s Canadian high school television series
2000s Canadian workplace comedy television series
YTV (Canadian TV channel) original programming
Television shows filmed in Montreal
2000s Canadian teen sitcoms
Television series set in restaurants
Television series by Corus Entertainment
Television series about teenagers